Pekon Township (also spelled Pekhon, Phekhon, Pekong, Pecong, Pékon) is a township of Taunggyi District in the Shan State of Myanmar. The principal town is Pekon.

Part of a popular tourist place and bird watching site, Inle Lake and Inlay Lake Wetland Sanctuary, lies in this township.

Reportedly, the township's southern police station was occupied and razed by civilian fighters. There is an ongoing battle between civilian fighters and Myanmar Military troops.

References

Townships of Shan State